The lateral margin of the groove of the frontal process of the maxilla is named the anterior lacrimal crest, and is continuous below with the orbital margin; at its junction with the orbital surface is a small tubercle, the lacrimal tubercle, which serves as a guide to the position of the lacrimal sac.

References 

Human head and neck